Deudorix is a large genus of butterflies in the family Lycaenidae. The species of this genus are found in the Old World and Australia.

Species
Deudorix affinis (Rothschild, 1915)
Deudorix antalus (Hopffer, 1855)
Deudorix apayao Schröder & Treadaway, 1983
Deudorix badhami Carcasson, 1961
Deudorix batikeli (Boisduval, 1833)
Deudorix batikelides Holland, 1920
Deudorix caliginosa Lathy, 1903
Deudorix ceramensis Ribbe, 1901
Deudorix chalybeata Joicey & Talbot, 1926
Deudorix dariaves Hewitson, 1877
Deudorix democles Miskin, 1884
Deudorix diara Swinhoe, 1896
Deudorix dinochares Grose-Smith, 1887
Deudorix dinomenes Grose-Smith, 1887
Deudorix diocles Hewitson, 1869
Deudorix diovis Hewitson, [1863]
Deudorix dohertyi Tytler, 1915
Deudorix ecaudata Gifford, 1963
Deudorix edwardsi Gabriel, 1939
Deudorix elioti Corbet, 1940
Deudorix epijarbas (Moore, [1858])
Deudorix epirus (C. & R. Felder, 1860)
Deudorix gaetulia de Nicéville, [1893]
Deudorix galathea (Swainson, 1821)
Deudorix hainana Chou & Gu, 1994
Deudorix hypargyria (Elwes, [1893])
Deudorix isocrates (Fabricius, 1793)
Deudorix jacksoni Talbot, 1935
Deudorix kayonza Stempffer, 1956
Deudorix kessuma (Horsfield, [1829])
Deudorix kuyoniana Matsumura, 1912
Deudorix livia (Klug, 1834)
Deudorix lorisona (Hewitson, 1863)
Deudorix loxius Hewitson, [1863]
Deudorix magda Gifford, 1963
Deudorix masamichii (Okubo, 1983)
Deudorix maudei Joicey & Talbot, 1916
Deudorix montana (Kielland, 1985)
Deudorix mpanda (Kielland, 1990)
Deudorix mulleri Tennent, 2000
Deudorix nicephora Hulstaert, 1924
Deudorix niepelti Joicey & Talbot, 1922
Deudorix novellus Yagishita, 2006
Deudorix odana Druce, 1887
Deudorix penningtoni van Son, 1949
Deudorix perse Hewitson, [1863]
Deudorix philippinensis Schröder, Treadaway & Hayashi, 1981
Deudorix rapaloides (Naritomi, 1941)
Deudorix renidens (Mabille, 1884)
Deudorix sankakuhonis Matsumura, 1938
Deudorix smilis Hewitson, [1863]
Deudorix staudingeri Druce, 1895
Deudorix strephanus Druce, 1896
Deudorix subguttata (Elwes, [1893])
Deudorix suk Stempffer, 1948
Deudorix sumatrensis Fruhstorfer, 1912
Deudorix ufipa Kielland, 1978
Deudorix vansomereni Stempffer, 1951
Deudorix vansoni Pennington, 1948
Deudorix wardii (Mabille, 1878)
Deudorix woodfordi Druce, 1891

Gallery

External links

"Deudorix Hewitson, 1863" at Markku Savela's Lepidoptera and Some Other Life Forms
Barcodes of life Images
Royal Museum of Central Africa Images
Tolweb

 
Deudorigini
Lycaenidae genera
Taxa named by William Chapman Hewitson